The 2011 Magny-Cours Superbike World Championship round was the twelfth round of the 2011 Superbike World Championship. It took place on the weekend of September 30 and October 1–2, 2011 at Circuit de Nevers Magny-Cours, France.

Carlos Checa became 2011 Superbike World Champion after winning Race 1, while Ducati claimed the Manufacturers' Championship after Race 2.
In Supersport, Chaz Davies, who finishing sixth in the race, secured his title with one round remaining.

Results

Superbike race 1 classification

Superbike race 2 classification

Supersport race classification

Magny-Cours Round
Magny-Cours